This is a list of the mammal species recorded in Saint Kitts and Nevis. Of the mammal species in Saint Kitts and Nevis, one is vulnerable, one is near threatened, and one is classified as extinct.

The following tags are used to highlight each species' conservation status as assessed by the International Union for Conservation of Nature:

Some species were assessed using an earlier set of criteria. Species assessed using this system have the following instead of near threatened and least concern categories:

Subclass: Theria

Infraclass: Eutheria

Order: Sirenia (manatees and dugongs)

Sirenia is an order of fully aquatic, herbivorous mammals that inhabit rivers, estuaries, coastal marine waters, swamps, and marine wetlands. All four species are endangered.

Family: Trichechidae
Genus: Trichechus
 West Indian manatee, T. manatus  extirpated

Order: Rodentia (rodents)

Rodents make up the largest order of mammals, with over 40% of mammalian species. They have two incisors in the upper and lower jaw which grow continually and must be kept short by gnawing.

Family: Cricetidae
Subfamily: Sigmodontinae
Genus:	Pennatomys
Nevis rice rat, P. nivalis 
Suborder: Sciuromorpha
Family: Sciuridae (squirrels)
Subfamily: Sciurinae
Tribe: Sciurini
Genus: Sciurus
 Red squirrel, S. vulgaris  introduced

Order: Primates

The order Primates includes the lemurs, monkeys, and apes, with the latter category including humans.

Family: Cercopithecidae
Genus: Chlorocebus
 Green monkey, C. sabaeus  introduced

Order: Chiroptera (bats)

The bats' most distinguishing feature is that their forelimbs are developed as wings, making them the only mammals capable of flight. Bat species account for about 20% of all mammals.

Family: Noctilionidae
Genus: Noctilio
 Greater bulldog bat, N. leporinus LC
Family: Molossidae
Genus: Tadarida
 Mexican free-tailed bat, Tadarida brasiliensis LR/nt
Family: Phyllostomidae
Subfamily: Brachyphyllinae
Genus: Brachyphylla
 Antillean fruit-eating bat, Brachyphylla cavernarum LR/lc
Subfamily: Carolliinae
Genus: Carollia
 Seba's short-tailed bat, Carollia perspicillata LR/lc
Subfamily: Stenodermatinae
Genus: Artibeus
 Jamaican fruit bat, Artibeus jamaicensis LR/lc

Order: Cetacea (whales)

The order Cetacea includes whales, dolphins and porpoises. They are the mammals most fully adapted to aquatic life with a spindle-shaped nearly hairless body, protected by a thick layer of blubber, and forelimbs and tail modified to provide propulsion underwater.

Suborder: Mysticeti
Family: Balaenopteridae (baleen whales)
Genus: Balaenoptera 
 Common minke whale, Balaenoptera acutorostrata
 Sei whale, Balaenoptera borealis
 Bryde's whale, Balaenoptera brydei
 Blue whale, Balaenoptera musculus
Genus: Megaptera
 Humpback whale, Megaptera novaeangliae
Suborder: Odontoceti
Superfamily: Platanistoidea
Family: Delphinidae (marine dolphins)
Genus: Delphinus
 Short-beaked common dolphin, Delphinus delphis DD
Genus: Feresa
 Pygmy killer whale, Feresa attenuata DD
Genus: Globicephala
 Short-finned pilot whale, Globicephala macrorhyncus DD
Genus: Lagenodelphis
 Fraser's dolphin, Lagenodelphis hosei DD
Genus: Grampus
 Risso's dolphin, Grampus griseus DD
Genus: Orcinus
 Killer whale, Orcinus orca DD
Genus: Peponocephala
 Melon-headed whale, Peponocephala electra DD
Genus: Pseudorca
 False killer whale, Pseudorca crassidens DD
Genus: Stenella
 Pantropical spotted dolphin, Stenella attenuata DD
 Clymene dolphin, Stenella clymene DD
 Striped dolphin, Stenella coeruleoalba DD
 Atlantic spotted dolphin, Stenella frontalis DD
 Spinner dolphin, Stenella longirostris DD
Genus: Steno
 Rough-toothed dolphin, Steno bredanensis DD
Genus: Tursiops
 Common bottlenose dolphin, Tursiops truncatus
Family: Physeteridae (sperm whales)
Genus: Physeter
 Sperm whale, Physeter catodon DD
Family: Kogiidae (dwarf sperm whales)
Genus: Kogia
 Pygmy sperm whale, Kogia breviceps DD
 Dwarf sperm whale, Kogia sima DD
Superfamily Ziphioidea
Family: Ziphidae (beaked whales)
Genus: Mesoplodon
 Gervais' beaked whale, Mesoplodon europaeus DD
 Blainville's beaked whale, Mesoplodon densirostris DD
 True's beaked whale, Mesoplodon mirus DD
Genus: Ziphius
 Cuvier's beaked whale, Ziphius cavirostris DD

Order: Carnivora (carnivorans)

There are over 260 species of carnivorans, the majority of which feed primarily on meat. They have a characteristic skull shape and dentition. 
Suborder: Pinnipedia
Family: Phocidae (earless seals)
Genus: Neomonachus
Caribbean monk seal, Neomonachus tropicalis EX

Notes

References

See also
List of chordate orders
Lists of mammals by region
List of prehistoric mammals
Mammal classification
List of mammals described in the 2000s

Saint Kitts and Nevis
Mammals
Saint Kitts and Nevis